"Coming Over" is the second Japanese single album by the South Korean–Chinese boy group EXO. It was released on December 7, 2016 by Avex Trax in Japan. In South Korea, the single was released on January 4, 2017. The single features six tracks, including three original songs. The single was re-released on January 31, 2018 along with EXO's first Japanese studio album COUNTDOWN.

Background and release 
On September 7, EXO announced through a video that they would be releasing their second Japanese single titled "Coming Over" containing three original Japanese tracks in December. On October 7, the full song was made available in Japan through the AWA application, a popular Japanese streaming service, and was  played over 100,000 times in the 12 hours before the promotional event ended. A short version of the music video for "Coming Over" was released on November 18. The single was officially released on December 7.

Live performance 
EXO began performing "Coming Over" in their Exo Planet 3 – The Exo'rdium concerts in Tokyo and Osaka.
The group performed "Coming Over" on a-nation concert on August 26, 2017.

Commercial performance 
"Coming Over" sold over 150,000 copies within the first week of its release, making EXO the first international artist to have two consecutive Japanese single albums with first-week sales of over 100,000 copies. The single ranked at number 41 on Oricon's 2016 year-end singles chart, the highest position among songs by South Korean artists.

Track listing

Charts

Weekly charts

Monthly charts

Year-end charts

Sales

Release history

Notes

References 

Exo songs
2016 singles
Japanese-language songs
2016 songs
Avex Trax singles
Songs written by Andreas Öberg
Songs written by Sean Alexander
Songs written by Drew Ryan Scott